The Brownhill & Kramer Hosiery Mill is a historic building complex in the Fishtown neighborhood of Philadelphia, Pennsylvania.

It was listed on the National Register of Historic Places in 2014.

The buildings are currently known as The Chesterman and has been rehabbed into rental apartments units.

References

External links
NPS page
NRHP nomination form

Commercial buildings on the National Register of Historic Places in Philadelphia